Ronald Lewis Schlicher (September 16, 1956 – September 26, 2019) joined the State Department in 1982 as a diplomat and career foreign service officer with the rank of Minister-Counselor in the Department of State. He served as the Deputy Chief of Mission in Lebanon (chargé d'affaires) 1994–96 and United States Consul-General in Jerusalem from 2000 to November 2002. He also served as ambassador to Cyprus from 2005 to 2008. On September 2, 2008, he assumed the position of Principal Deputy Assistant Coordinator for Counterterrorism.

Personal
Schlicher was born in Sylacauga, Alabama and grew up in Chattanooga. He was an alumnus of Red Bank High School and attended the University of Tennessee and graduated with a Bachelor's degree in 1978 and JD from the University of Tennessee College of Law in 1981.

Schlicher was fluent in French and Arabic.

After his diplomatic career ended (sometime after 2011) he settled down in Brentwood, Tennessee, where he died in 2019.

Notes

External links

1956 births
2019 deaths
People from Brentwood, Tennessee
People from Chattanooga, Tennessee
People from Sylacauga, Alabama
Ambassadors of the United States to Cyprus
Ambassadors of the United States to Lebanon
United States Foreign Service personnel
University of Tennessee alumni
20th-century American diplomats
21st-century American diplomats